Ankuri Mahadev is a Hindu temple located in Mahadeva in the Saptari District of Nepal. The place has Shiva Linga in the main temple, as well as Goddess Parvati and God Hanuman in other temples. The Shiva Linga has a dent of size of fist on the top. It is said that the place was a crematorium long ago and was an isolated place. Some cowherds from nearby villages used to go there. They brought it several times to their home, but the Shiva Ling used to return to its own place. It is also said that whoever tried to take the Shiva Linga their home, misery befell upon them and a member of their family fell sick or died. Later the master of the cowherds heard about these and built a temple for Shiva Linga on the same place.

It is a well known site of pilgrimage for Lord Shiva devotees and every year there are big fairs on festivals like Shivaratri and Anant Chaturdashi. It is a holy place to perform sacred yajna.

Hindu temples in Madhesh Province
Shiva temples in Nepal
Saptari District